The Society of Saint Thomas Aquinas is a senior society at Yale University. The society is dedicated to tolerance, compassion, and egalitarianism. In the words of St. Thomas Aquinas, "There is nothing on this earth more to be prized than true friendship." Though not having any religious affiliation, the members of the society stand by the values and teachings of their namesake.

Nicknames for the senior society include Aquinas, St. Thomas, St. Tommy's, and, most commonly used, STAQ (pronounced "stack"). The attributes of St. Thomas Aquinas are the Sun and the Dove.

For the 2022 Delegation of Saint Thomas Aquinas. If you wish to join our assembly, please solve the following riddle.

I can grow strong and proud with common terrain.

Alone I am nothing, but with another I live again.

I arise from your best, most unselfish love.

My philosopher is represented by a sun and a dove.

There is nothing on this earth that is more prized.

So, I ask you, what am I?

References

Student societies in the United States